Manco Inca Yupanqui ( 1515 – c. 1544) (Manqu Inka Yupanki in Quechua) was the founder and monarch (Sapa Inca) of the independent Neo-Inca State in Vilcabamba, although he was originally a puppet Inca Emperor installed by the Spaniards. He was also known as "Manco II" and "Manco Cápac II" ("Manqu Qhapaq II"). He was one of the sons of Huayna Capac and a younger brother of Huascar.

Biography

Origin and enthronement
Manco Inca was one of the more than 50 sons of Huayna Capac, probably born in 1515, in Cusco. When Atahualpa's troops took the city under the command of General Quizquiz, they killed the descendants of Huayna Capac, the Huascar supporters, and anyone who could try to take the place of the Inca. Because of this, Manco Inca was forced to flee, avoiding any contact with the atahualpists.

On 14 November, 1533, he met the conquistador Francisco Pizarro and his contingent, both Inca and Spanish. This and other events such as the massacre of Atahualpa led Manco Inca to believe that the Spaniards were "saviors" sent by the gods.

Túpac Huallpa was a puppet ruler crowned by Francisco Pizarro. After his death, Manco Inca joined Francisco Pizarro and Diego de Almagro in Cajamarca. When Pizarro's forces arrived in Cusco, he had the caciques acknowledge Manco as their Inca. Manco Inca then joined Almagro and Hernando de Soto in pursuit of Quizquiz.

When Pizarro left Cuzco with Almagro and Manco Inca, for Jauja in pursuit of Quizquiz, Francisco left his younger brothers Gonzalo Pizarro and Juan Pizarro as regidores, and a ninety-man garrison in the city.

The Pizarro brothers so mistreated Manco Inca that he ultimately tried to escape in 1535. He failed, was captured and imprisoned. Hernando Pizarro released him to recover a golden statue of his father Huayna Capac. Only accompanied by two Spaniards, he easily escaped a second time. Manco then gathered an army of 200,000 Inca warriors and laid siege to Cusco in early 1536, taking advantage of Diego de Almagro's absence.

After ten months (see the siege of Cuzco), Manco retreated to the nearby fortress of Ollantaytambo in 1537.  Here Manco successfully defended attacks by the Spaniards in the battle of Ollantaytambo.

Manco coordinated his siege of Cusco with one on Lima, led by one of his captains, Quiso Yupanqui. The Incans were able to defeat four relief expeditions sent by Francisco Pizarro from Lima.  This resulted in the death of nearly 500 Spanish soldiers.  Some Spaniards were captured and sent to Ollantaytambo.

Alonso de Alvarado was sent by Pizarro to Cusco, but upon his arrival at Abancay, he and his army were captured by Rodrigo Orgóñez in the Battle of Abancay. This was the beginning of the first civil war between the conquistadors.

Abandoning Ollantaytambo (and effectively giving up the highlands of the empire), Manco Inca retreated to Vitcos and finally to the remote jungles of Vilcabamba, where he founded the Neo-Inca State which lasted until the death of Túpac Amaru in 1572. From there, he continued his attacks against the Wankas (one of the most important allies of the Spaniards), having some success after fierce battles, and to the highlands of present-day Bolivia, where after many battles his army was defeated.

The Spaniards crowned his younger half brother Paullu Inca as puppet Sapa Inca after his retreat for his valuable help in that last campaign. The Spanish succeeded in capturing Manco's sister-wife, Cura Ocllo, and had her brutally murdered in 1539.

Death
After many guerrilla battles in the mountainous regions of Vilcabamba, Manco was murdered in 1544 in the Inca center of Vitcos by supporters of Diego de Almagro who had previously assassinated Francisco Pizarro and who were in hiding under Manco's protection. They in turn were all killed by Manco's soldiers.

Manco was succeeded by his son Sayri Tupaq.  Manco Inca had several sons, including Sayri Tupaq, Titu Cusi, and Túpac Amaru.

See also 
History of Cusco
Spanish conquest of Peru
Túpac Amaru

References

Inca emperors
1516 births
1544 deaths
16th-century murdered monarchs
Colonial Bolivia
Viceroyalty of Peru people
1540s in Peru
16th century in the Viceroyalty of Peru
History of Lima
16th-century monarchs in South America
Murder in 1544